Luce Rains is an American actor known for such films and television series as No Country for Old Men, Running with the Devil with Nicolas Cage, 3:10 to Yuma, Appaloosa, Hostiles, Overlook, NM and Walker, Texas Ranger.

References

External links

Living people
American film actors
American television actors
People from Lexington, Kentucky
Year of birth missing (living people)